The King of Masks is a 1996 Chinese film directed by Wu Tianming.

Synopsis
In 1930s China, Wang is The King of Masks, an aged street performer who practices the change-mask opera art of bian lian. He laments that he has no male heirs to carry on his mysterious and complicated art and trade. At an illegal child market, Wang buys what he believes to be an orphan boy to become his adopted grandson and apprentice.

However, Wang soon learns his new disciple is in fact a girl. As tradition dictates that he cannot pass his art onto a girl, he tries to abandon her, but she stubbornly stays with him. He later calls her "doggie" and has her refer to him as "boss". He then begins to train her to be a flexible contortionist street performer. While looking at his masks, she accidentally sets his humble residence on fire. Out of guilt, she runs away. She is then captured by two men and held in a room with a boy to be sold later. Doggie helps the boy escape and takes him to Wang to have as a grandson.

Then, Wang is falsely accused of kidnapping the boy, a rich family's child, and is thrown in jail.  Doggie goes to one of her friends, a famous performer in the local opera, threatening to kill herself if he or any of his guests, including a local military general, are unable to help Wang. The King of Masks is eventually freed, and he finally accepts the girl as his granddaughter and teaches her his art.

Reception
The film won a number of awards at various film festivals around the world. It was released in the United States on June 13, 1999 on a limited theatrical release and earned about one million US dollars. Roger Ebert, writing for the Chicago Sun-Times, gave the film 3 stars, calling it a  film "of simplicity, beauty and surprising emotional power" that "benefits enormously from the beauty of the setting, the costumes and the customs".

Awards and nominations
 Huabiao Awards, 1995
 Outstanding Co-Production Film
 Golden Rooster Awards, 1996
 Best Co-Produced Film
 Best Director—Wu Tianming
 Frankfurt Children and Young People's Film Festival, 1996
 Lucas, Children's Section
 Tokyo International Film Festival, 1996
 Best Actor—Zhu Xu
 Best Director—Wu Tianming
29th International Film Festival of India
Golden Peacock (Best Film)
 Canberra International Film Festival, 1997
 Audience Award
 Carrousel International du Film, 1997
 Camério for Best Actor—Zhu Xu
 Camério for Best Actress—Zhou Renying
 Camério for Best Film
 Istanbul International Film Festival, 1997
 C.I.C.A.E. Award
 Golden Tulip
 Singapore International Film Festival, 1997
 Silver Screen Award for Best Asian Director—Wu Tianming
 Fajr Film Festival, 1998
 Crystal Simorgh for Best Actor—Zhu Xu
 Würzburg International Filmweekend, 1999
 Children's Film Award
 Satellite Awards, 2000
 Best Foreign Language Motion Picture (nominated)
 16th Ale Kino! Festival, 1998
 Grand Prix—Golden Poznań Goats for Best Movie
 Marcinek—Special Mention by Children Jury for Movie
 Best Foreign Director—Tian-Ming Wu
 Best Foreign Actor or Actress—Chu Yuk
 Best Foreign Child Actor or Actress—Chao Yim Yin
 Best Set Decoration in Foreign Movie—Wu Xujing

References

External links
 
 
 
 The King of Masks at the Chinese Movie Database
 Bianlian learning package for school children at Chinese Cinema '07
 

1990s Mandarin-language films
Films set in Sichuan
Films set in the 1930s
1996 films
Films directed by Wu Tianming
Chinese drama films